Lykkesholm Castle (Lykkesholm Slot) is a manor house located in  the parish of Ellested  in Nyborg Municipality, Denmark.
The estate is situated about 3 km southwest of the Funen town of Ørbæk and approx. 21 km southeast of Odense.

The main building was built in 1600 under designed by  architect  Domenicus Badiaz (c. 1591-c. 1607). It was remodeled in 1668 and during 1784–1786. Today it resembles a large manor house painted bright yellow. The property is currently  a hotel with conference facilities  and breeding farm.

References

External links
Lykkesholm Slot Official site

Castles in Denmark
Manor houses in Denmark
Listed buildings and structures in Nyborg Municipality